Marie Brizard Wine & Spirits is a French wine and spirits producer and distributor. The company was founded in 1991. It is listed on the French stock market, and is a member of the CAC Small 90 index. The recipes of its most famous liquor, "Anisette", was created in 1755.

Activities 
The company operates primarily in France, Poland, and in the United States, producing and distributing a range of wines and spirits, such as the vodka brands Sobieski and Krupnik, the whisky William Peel, the liquor range Marie Brizard, the Cognac Gautier cognac, and the tequila San Jose. It also owns a wide range of wines, including Moncigale, Marques del Puerto, and the flavoured wine brand Fruits & Wine.

Shareholders 
As of March 22, 2018, the largest shareholders of the company are:
Cofepp : 29.47%
Diana holding : 13.90% 
Schroder IM : 4,98%
DF Holding : 4.94% 
Others : 46.71%

See also 
 Marie Brizard et Roger International

References

External links
Corporate webpage (fr)

Drink companies of France
Food and drink companies established in 1991
1991 establishments in France
Companies listed on Euronext Paris